Cover Girls is a 1977 American made-for-television crime drama film directed by Jerry London and starring Cornelia Sharpe, Jayne Kennedy and Don Galloway.

Plot
Two world class models, Linda and Monique, work for an American intelligence agency. They are given a mission to track down an embezzler who is also being chased by a criminal, Michael. Linda falls for the embezzler.

Cast
 Cornelia Sharpe as Linda Allen
 Jayne Kennedy as Monique Lawrence
 Don Galloway as James Andrews
 Michael Baseleon as Paul Richards
 DeVeren Bookwalter as Karl
 Jerry Douglas as Fritz Porter
 Sean Garrison as Sven 
 Don Johnson as Johnny Wilson
 George Lazenby as Michael 
 Bill Overton as Football Player
 Ellen Travolta as The Photographer 
 Vince Edwards as Bradner
 Lenore Stevens as Maria
 Eric Holland as Bodyguard #1
 Paul Dumont as Georg
 Maurice Marsac as Mireau
 James Almanzar as Hans
 Todd Martin as Bodyguard #2
 Fritzi Burr as Seamstress #1
 June Whitley Taylor as Seamstress #2
 Peter Gunneau as French Detective 
 Brian Baker as Uniform Sergeant 
 Ben Frommer as Tourist In Bus
 Kieu Chinh as Chinese Model
 Carolyn Brandt as Girl Singer
 Bob Hastings as Joe

Production
The success of Charlie's Angels in the 1976-77 ratings season prompted all the American TV networks to feature more sexy young women in action-orientated roles, either adding them to existing programs or introducing new shows that focused on them.  NBC picked up The Bionic Woman from ABC and also added young female characters to the 1977–78 seasons of Baa Baa Black Sheep and BJ and the Bear. They introduced several new shows with female sex symbol leads such as Quark, The Roller Girls and Who's Watching the Kids?, as well as commissioning pilots for several series which were direct imitations of Charlie's Angels: The Secret War of Jackie's Girls, The Hunted Lady and Cover Girls.

Reception
The Los Angeles Times said "the only things not negligible about" the movie was "are the radiant beauty of its stars, Grady Hunt's elegant costumes for them and a creditable acting job by Vince Edwards."

Writer Marcia Hilmes contrasted the film negatively with Charlie's Angels, arguing that in Angels the lead characters were always first and foremost detectives, with any sexual objectification as an aid to their detective work, whereas in Cover Girls the leads seemed to place as much emphasis on their modelling as their crime fighting. She also pointed out that Cover Girls included scenes implying an erotic relationship between the two leads, further objectifying them sexually.

See also
 List of American films of 1977

References

Notes

External links

Cover Girls at Letterbox DVD
Cover Girls at BFI

1977 television films
1977 films
American television films
1970s English-language films